Nicaisolopha is a genus of true oysters.

Fossil record
Fossils of Nicaisolopha are found in marine strata from Late Cretaceous to Quaternary (age range: from 93.9 to 0.012 million years ago.).  Fossils are known from Egypt, South Africa, Algeria, India, Jordan, Libya, Madagascar, Mozambique, Nigeria, Peru, Senegal, Serbia and Montenegro, Tunisia, Russia and United States.

Species
The World Register of Marine Species lists these species:

Nicaisolopha nicaisei (Coquand, 1862)  † 
Nicaisolopha tridacnaeformis (Cox, 1927)

References

Ostreidae
Bivalve genera
Fossils of Serbia